Carbondale Community High School is a public high school located in Carbondale, Illinois, United States. It serves grades 9-12 and is part of its own school district, having several different feeder schools within the city and outside of it. In 2013, 1093 students attended the school.

Athletics
In all sports, Carbondale has huge rivalries with Murphysboro's and Marion's teams. The basketball team has been among the best in southern Illinois, with Cahokia High School being Carbondale's hardest-to-defeat opponent.

Notable alumni
 Ben Falcone (1991) – an American actor, comedian and filmmaker.
 John Ratcliffe (1983) - former Representative for Texas's 4th district and Director of National Intelligence for President Donald Trump
 Stephen Bardo (1986) – basketball player
 Justin Dentmon (2004) – basketball player
 Mark Gottfried  – basketball player, head coach
 Les Taylor (1968) – basketball player
 David Sulzer/Dave Soldier (1974) – attended two years; neuroscientist at Columbia University and experimental musician
Shawn Colvin (1978) – Grammy-award winning musical artist
Troy Hudson - NBA basketball player

References

External links
Official website
Greatschools.net - Carbondale Community High School

Public high schools in Illinois
Carbondale, Illinois
Schools in Jackson County, Illinois